John Rogan (born January 30, 1960) is a former American football quarterback who played two seasons with the Montreal Concordes of the Canadian Football League. He played college football at Yale University and attended Chaminade High School in Mineola, New York.

References

External links
Just Sports Stats
CFLapedia stats
College Stats
John Rogan released

Living people
1960 births
American football quarterbacks
Canadian football quarterbacks
Players of Canadian football from New York (state)
Yale Bulldogs football players
Montreal Concordes players
Players of American football from New York City